Herman Gundlach, Jr. (July 16, 1913 – May 4, 2005) was an American football offensive lineman in the National Football League for the Boston Redskins.  He played at Worcester Academy, then college football at Harvard University.

External links
HERMAN GUNDLACH - The Real Deal
Curious News

1913 births
2005 deaths
People from Houghton, Michigan
Worcester Academy alumni
Players of American football from Michigan
American football offensive guards
Harvard Crimson football players
Boston Redskins players